This list of major Negro league baseball teams consists of teams that played in the seven major Negro baseball leagues. For a league to be considered "major," there were usually two top-tier leagues at a time: one representing the northeastern states – known as the "East", and one representing the north-central states – known as the "West".  Formal leagues were organized in 1920.

West, 1920–1931: Negro National League (1920–1931)
East, 1923–1928: Eastern Colored League
East, 1929: American Negro League
East/West, 1932: East–West League & Negro Southern League (1920–1936)
East, 1933–1948: Negro National League (1933–1948)
West, 1937–1948: Negro American League

In December 2020, 75 years and one month after Jackie Robinson signed a contract with the Brooklyn Dodgers, Major League Baseball announced they were finally recognizing these seven major leagues on par with other major leagues. 

The following teams played at least one partial season in one of the major Negro leagues. Some teams also played as either a barnstorming (or traveling) team, a minor league team or a team that existed after the integration of Major League Baseball (1946) when the talent level declined dramatically.

Alabama

Arkansas

Delaware

District of Columbia

Florida

Georgia

Illinois

Indiana

Kentucky

Louisiana

Maryland

Michigan

Missouri

New Jersey

New York

Ohio

Pennsylvania

Tennessee

Wisconsin

Traveling teams

References

External links
 Leagues & Teams at the Negro Leagues Baseball Museum
 The Negro League Teams at the Negro League Baseball Players Association
 Negro Leagues Database at Seamheads.com
 Negro League Team Encyclopedia at Baseball-Reference.com

Negro league baseball teams
Negro league baseball
 
major Negro league